"Jeffty Is Five" is a fantasy short story by American author Harlan Ellison.  It was first published in The Magazine of Fantasy & Science Fiction in 1977, then was included in DAW's The 1978 Annual World's Best SF in 1978 and Ellison's short story collection Shatterday two years later. According to Ellison, it was partially inspired by a fragment of conversation that he misheard at a party at the home of actor Walter Koenig: "How is Jeff?" "Jeff is fine. He's always fine," which he perceived as "Jeff is five, he's always five." Ellison based the character of Jeffty on Joshua Andrew Koenig, Walter's son. He declared:

Plot
Jeffty is a boy who never grows past the age of five — physically, mentally, or chronologically. The narrator, Jeffty's friend from the age of five well into adulthood, discovers that Jeffty has the ability to access current versions of popular culture from the narrator's youth.  His radio plays all-new episodes of long-canceled serial programs, broadcast on radio stations that no longer exist. He can buy all-new issues of long-discontinued pulp magazines such as The Shadow and Doc Savage, with all-new stories by long-dead authors such as Stanley G. Weinbaum, Edgar Rice Burroughs, and Robert E. Howard. Jeffty can even watch films that are adaptations of old science fiction novels such as Alfred Bester's The Demolished Man. The narrator is privy to this world because of Jeffty's trust, while the rest of the world (the world that got older as Jeffty did not) is not. While Jeffty is cute and has the sweetness and humor of an actual five-year-old boy, his parents are scared of him, wondering why he is staying a little boy in every way. 

While waiting in line at the local movie house, waiting for the narrator to show up, Jeffty borrows a portable radio from some teens and tunes in a radio show from the past. When Jeffty is unable to return the radio to its normal setting, the teenagers beat him badly. Once returned to his home, Jeffty somehow dies. (It is unknown if it was due to the wounds, due to a murder, or due to a combination of the both.)

Reception
"Jeffty Is Five" won the 1977 Nebula Award for Best Short Story and the 1978 Hugo Award for Best Short Story, and was nominated for the 1978 World Fantasy Award—Short Fiction. It was also voted in a 1999 online poll of Locus readers as the best short story of all time.

Publishers Weekly called it "touching but scary", and Tor.com called it "heartbreaking", while at the SF Site, Paul Kincaid described it as "a wonder of sustained nostalgia coupled with despair at the modern world", but noted that it "only really succeeds because of the tragedy of [its] ending."

References

Hugo Award for Best Short Story winning works
Short stories by Harlan Ellison
1977 short stories
Works originally published in The Magazine of Fantasy & Science Fiction
Nebula Award for Best Short Story-winning works
Fantasy short stories